San Pedro de Quemes is one of the cantons of the San Pedro de Quemes Municipality, the second municipal section of the Nor Lípez Province in the Potosí Department of Bolivia. During the census of 2001 it had 574 inhabitants. Its seat is San Pedro de Quemes with a population of 490 in 2001.

References

External links

San Pedro de Quemes Municipality: population data and map

Cantons of Potosí Department
Cantons of Bolivia